Beatrice is a rural locality in the Tablelands Region, Queensland, Australia.

History 
Beatrice River State School opened on 14 November 1921. It closed in 1946.

References 

Tablelands Region
Localities in Queensland